The Curaçao Athletics Association (CAB; Curaçaose Atletiek Bond) is the governing body for the sport of athletics in Curaçao.  Current president is Willem Cordilia.

History 
CAB was founded on September 16, 1966.

Affiliations 
CAB is an observer member federation for Curaçao in the
Central American and Caribbean Athletic Confederation (CACAC)
CAB is invited to participate at the 
CARIFTA Games
Moreover, it is part of the following national organisations:
Curaçao Sport & Olympic Federation (CSOF)
However, the CSOF is not recognized by the IOC.  After modifying its Charter in 1996, only Olympic Committees representing independent states are admitted as new IOC members.  Athletes from Curaçao had to participate at the 2012 Summer Olympics as Independent Olympic Athletes under the Olympic flag.

National records 
CAB maintains the Curaçaoan records in athletics.

External links 
Official webpage

References 

Athletics organizations
Athletics in Curaçao
Athletics
1966 establishments in Curaçao
Sports organizations established in 1966
National governing bodies for athletics